The pyramid of Sahure is a pyramid complex built in the late 26th to 25th century BC for the Egyptian pharaoh Sahure of the Fifth Dynasty. It introduced a period of pyramid building by Sahure's successors in Abusir, on a location earlier used by Userkaf for his sun temple. The site was first thoroughly excavated by Ludwig Borchardt between March 1907 and 1908, who wrote the standard work  between 1910 and 1913.

The pyramid complex's layout was adopted by succeeding kings of the Fifth and Sixth Dynasties, marking a milestone in pyramid complex construction. Compared to the preceding Fourth Dynasty, the immensity of the constructions was dramatically reduced but, in tandem, the decorative programme proliferated and temples were augmented by enlarged storeroom complexes. The complex is estimated to have had  of finely carved relief adorning its walls, of which  has been preserved. For comparison, Sahure's temple contained 370 running metres (1,214 running feet) of such relief decoration, while the temple of Khufu's Great Pyramid contained 100 running metres (328 running feet). The complex is also remarkable for the array of valuable materials – such as granite, alabaster and basalt – used extensively in its construction.

The main pyramid was built from roughly hewn limestone blocks bound with mud mortar and encased with fine white Tura limestone. The architects made an error in demarcating the pyramid base, extending it too far east. The pyramid's internal chambers were devastated by stone thieves, rendering an accurate reconstruction impossible. Stone fragments believed to belong to the king's basalt sarcophagus are the only remains of the burial that have been found. The mortuary temple adjacent to the pyramid's east face comprises an entrance hall, an open courtyard, a five-niche statue chapel, an offering hall, and storerooms. These elements had appeared in mortuary temples since the reign of Khafre. The valley temple is situated on Abusir lake and is unusual for having two entrances: the main on its east side, and a secondary one on its south. It remains unclear why a second entry point was built, though it may have been connected to a pyramid town to its south.

Sahure's mortuary temple became the object of a cult of Sekhmet around the Eighteenth Dynasty. The cult was active through to the Ptolemaic Kingdom, though its influence began to wane following the reign of Ramesses II. This period heralded the first wave of destruction on the Abusir monuments, whilst Sahure's escaped the dismantlement, possibly as a result of the cult's presence. The monuments stirred interest again in the Twenty-Fifth to Twenty-Sixth Dynasties, which is shown by the copying of reliefs from the mortuary temples of Sahure, Nyuserre and Pepi II by the pharaoh Taharqa for the temple of Kawa in Nubia. A second wave of destruction of the Abusir monuments took place in the Twenty-Seventh Dynasty, but Sahure's temple was spared again, the cult still being present. With the onset of the Roman period, the Abusir monuments, including Sahure's, were subjected to a third wave of destruction. At the beginning of the Christian era, Sahure's temple became the site of a Coptic shrine, as evidenced by the recovery of pottery and graffiti dating to between the 4th and 7th century AD. Thereafter, until the late 19th century, the monuments were periodically quarried for limestone.

Location and excavation 

Sahure chose a site near Abusir for his funerary monument, thus constructing the first pyramid in the region. Earlier, Userkaf, founder of the Fifth Dynasty, chose Abusir for his sun temple. It is unclear why Userkaf sought such a remote site. It may have been significant for the nearby cult of Ra, or, in the opinion of the Egyptologist Werner Kaiser, the southernmost point from which the gilded pyramidion of the pillar-like structure in the temple of Ra in Heliopolis could be seen. It is clear, however, that his decision influenced the history of Abusir, including Sahure's decision to build his monument there. Three of the Abusir pyramids–Sahure, Neferirkare and Neferefre– are linked at the northwest corners by an imaginary line running to Heliopolis (Iunu). The diagonal was broken by Nyuserre, who positioned his complex between those of Neferirkare and Sahure.

Early excavators did not perform thorough investigations of Sahure's monument, perhaps discouraged by its ruined state. In 1838, John Shae Perring, an engineer working under Colonel Howard Vyse, cleared the entrances to the Sahure, Neferirkare and Nyuserre pyramids. Perring was the first to enter the substructure of Sahure's pyramid in modern times. Five years later, Karl Richard Lepsius, sponsored by King Frederick William IV of Prussia, explored the Abusir necropolis and catalogued Sahure's pyramid as XVIII. The pyramid was also re-entered by Jacques de Morgan, but he too did not explore further. No further investigations were performed for the next fifty years until the Egyptologist Ludwig Borchardt visited the site.

From 1902 to 1908, Borchardt, working for the Deutsche Orient-Gesellschaft (German Oriental Society), had the Abusir pyramids resurveyed and their adjoining temples and causeways excavated. From March 1907 to March 1908, Borchardt had Sahure's pyramid thoroughly investigated, and had trial digs conducted at nearby sites, including Neferefre's unfinished pyramid. He published his findings in the two-volume study Das Grabdenkmal des Königs Sahu-re (1910–13), which remains the standard work on the complex.

In 1994, the Egyptian Supreme Council of Antiquities opened the Abusir necropolis to tourism. In preparation, restorative works were conducted at Sahure's pyramid. The archeologist Zahi Hawass had a segment of Sahure's causeway cleaned and reconstructed, during which large relief-decorated limestone blocks that had been buried in the sand were uncovered. The reliefs found on these blocks were thematically and artistically unique and shed new light on the decorative programme of the complex.

Mortuary complex

Layout 

Old Kingdom mortuary complexes typically consist of five main components: (1) a valley temple; (2) a causeway; (3) a mortuary temple; (4) a cult pyramid; and (5) the main pyramid. Sahure's east–west oriented complex contains all of these elements. From the outset of the Fifth Dynasty, the main pyramids were dramatically reduced in size and adopted simplified construction techniques. Meanwhile, relief decoration advanced in wealth of subject matter and quality of workmanship, and temples were outfitted with expansive storeroom complexes. Except for minor deviations, the complex built by Sahure became the model for the remainder of the Fifth and Sixth Dynasties and the arrangement of the apartments of his mortuary temple became the standard for subsequent temples of the type in the Old Kingdom. Thereby it marked a milestone in the development of pyramid complex construction.

The complex is well-decorated, containing thematically diverse relief-work identified by the Egyptologist Miroslav Verner as "the highest level of the genre" found in the Old Kingdom. Across its entirety, it is estimated that  of finely carved relief adorned the walls. His mortuary temple alone contained 370 running metres (1,214 running feet) of relief decorations. By contrast, Sneferu's mortuary temple contained 64 running metres (210 running feet) of relief decoration, Khufu's contained 100 running metres (328 running feet), and the temple of Sahure's direct predecessor Userkaf contained 120 running metres (394 running feet). The mortuary temple of Pepi II, the last king of the Old Kingdom, contained 200 running metres (656 running feet) of relief decoration, indicating a decline after Sahure too. Additionally, Sahure reserved  of the mortuary temple's  floorplan for storerooms, accounting for 21.6% of its total area. This change represents a shift in priority towards the daily activities of the mortuary cult.

Main pyramid 
Although the subsoil of the area has never been investigated, evidence from the nearby mastaba of Ptahshepses suggests that the pyramid was not embedded into bedrock, but on a platform constructed from at least two layers of limestone. The pyramid had a core comprising six ascending steps, five of which remain. The steps were probably built from horizontally laid courses of limestone. The core consisted of low-grade roughly cut limestone bound with mud mortar, and was encased by fine white limestone.

The pyramid was constructed in a drastically different manner to those of the preceding dynasty. Its outer faces were framed using massive, roughly dressed grey limestone blocks well joined with mortar. The inner chambers were similarly framed, but using considerably smaller blocks. The core of the pyramid, between the two frames, was then packed with a rubble fill of limestone chips, pottery shards, and sand, with clay mortaring. This method, while less time- and resource-consuming, was careless and unstable, and meant that only the outer casing was constructed using high-quality limestone.

Owing to the poor condition of the monument, information about its dimensions and appearance contains a degree of imprecision. The architects made a notable error in demarcating the base, causing the southeast corner to extend  too far east. Consequently, it is not square. A ditch was left in the pyramid's north face during construction, which allowed workers to build the inner corridor and chambers while the core was being erected around it, before filling it in with rubble.

The pyramid is surrounded by a limestone paved courtyard, except where the mortuary temple sits, and is accessed from the temple's north and south wings. Enclosing the courtyard is a tall, rounded enclosure wall  at its thickest.

Substructure 

The substructure access is located slightly above ground on the pyramid's north face. A short descending corridor – lined with granite – leads into a vestibule, beyond which the route is guarded by a pink granite portcullis, with granite-lined walls on either side. The corridor following – lined with limestone – begins with a slight ascent becoming horizontal – lined with granite – just before its terminus.

Precise reconstruction of the substructure plan has been rendered impossible by the extensive damage that stone thieves wrought on the chambers. Clearance of the substructure in 2019 confirmed that the funerary apartment consisted of two rooms, with the burial chamber still to be investigated.

The antechamber lies on the vertical axis of the pyramid, occupying  of space, with the burial chamber to its west. The chambers had a ceiling constructed from three gabled layers of limestone blocks, which dispersed the weight from the superstructure onto either side of the passageway preventing collapse. Despite their size and weight, all but two have been broken. Inside the apartment's ruins, Perring found stone fragments – the only discovered remains of the burial – which he believed belonged to the king's basalt sarcophagus.

Valley temple 
Sahure's now-ruined valley temple was situated on the shore of Abusir lake, on the edge of the desert. The temple's walls slope inwards as they rise, their corners are formed into a convex torus mould up to a cavetto cornice with its own horizontal torus mould.

The temple had two entrances. Its main entrance, in the east, consisted of a landing ramp leading to a column-adorned portico. Its floor was paved with polished basalt, its walls had a red granite dado above which was limestone decorated with bas-relief, and it had a limestone ceiling that had been painted blue and decorated with relief-carved golden stars – representing the entrance into the Duat. The columns were formed into date palms, with leaves tied vertically to form capitals, and each column bore the king's titulary and name carved into the stone and painted green. An alternative entrance was built on the south side, accessed by a canal leading to a ramp up to another columned portico, this time containing four red granite columns. The columns, in contrast, were cylindrical in form and lacked any crown. This portico was also less deep and was paved with limestone. It remains unclear why this entrance was built. The wall may belong to Sahure's pyramid town, named "The soul of Sahure comes forth in glory".

The entrances were connected by passages to a T-shaped hall equipped with two columns. Borchardt describes the room as "two-tiered" (doppelt gestaffelt). It has a transverse space with a narrowed recess in its rear wall containing the two columns (the top steps of the two tiers), then an even narrower recess in the first's rear wall (the bottom steps of the two tiers). The room was originally adorned with polychromatic relief, and contained a scene depicting the king, as a sphinx or griffin, trampling captive Near Eastern and Libyan enemies led to him by the gods. The room connects to two more rooms: a room with a staircase up to the roof terrace at the south end, and causeway at its rearmost recess.

A relief depiction of troops from Sahure's valley temple can be contrasted with similar imagery in Userkaf's complex. In Sahure's scene, the soldiers are carved with near identical postures, a stark contrast to Userkaf's confused arrangement of overlapping figures. The latter has greater dynamism inducing more interest, whilst the former is more readily understood. The monotony of Sahure's scene was balanced by craftsmen introducing detail in the musculature and facial features of the figures.

Causeway 
The causeway was roofed, with narrow slits left in the ceiling slabs allowing light to enter, illuminating its walls covered in polychromatic bas-relief. These included scenes with seemingly apotropaic functions, such as a scene of the king represented as a sphinx crushing Egypt's enemies under his paw. Other scenes presented include offering bearers, animal slaughter, and the transport of the gilded pyramidion to the construction site. Only the base of the causeway, made of large limestone blocks, has been preserved.

The scene depicting emaciated nomads, reduced through starvation, to skin and bone – had important historical implications. The scene was thought only to exist in Unas' causeway, and was thus believed to be unique eyewitness testimony to the declining living standards of Saharan nomads brought about by the end of the Sahara wet phase in the middle of the 3rd millennium BC. The discovery of an identical scene in Sahure's causeway casts doubt onto this hypothesis. Instead, Miroslav Verner suggests that the nomads might have been brought into the pyramid town to demonstrate the hardships faced by builders bringing higher-quality stone from remote mountain areas.

A second discovered scene has implications for Fifth Dynasty genealogy. In this scene, Sahure is surrounded by his family in the palace garden Wtỉs-nfrw-Sꜣhw-rꜥ (Extolled is Sahure's beauty). The image confirms the identity of Sahure's consort, Meretnebty, and his twin sons, Ranefer and Netjerirenre. Ranefer, who is depicted closer to Sahure and bears the titles "king's son" and "chief lector-priest", may have been Sahure's eldest son, ascending to the throne as Neferirkare Kakai. Netjerirenre may be the ephemeral ruler Shepseskare, who took the throne after Neferefre's early death.

Another important relief discovered depicts a procession of ships, led by the king, being moored at an unidentified location. The relief originated on the causeway south wall, and although the location depicted cannot be identified, a corresponding relief on the same wall depicts the king, his mother and wife, awaiting the arrival of ships carrying myriad goods from the land of Punt – particular emphasis was placed on the Commiphora myrrha trees (nht n ꜥntw). Sahure's is the earliest recorded voyage taken by the Egyptians to Punt acquiring myrrh, electrum and wood from there.

Sahure is further depicted extracting myrrh with an adze from the tree in one scene, and banqueting with his family, including his sons, and officials near the tree in another. The trees depicted may not be Commiphora myrrha, as the use of an adze to extract resin was typically reserved for the Boswellia tree, and moreover the colour of the resin in Sahure's scene was identified by the Egyptologist Tarek El-Awady as yellowish brown, like Boswellia frankincense, and not red, like myrrh.

Mortuary temple 

The mortuary temple was an expansive, rectangular building positioned along the east–west axis, and situated on a level surface built from two layers of limestone blocks in front of the main pyramid's east face. The outer façade was inclined at 82° up to a cavetto cornice with torus mould. In its layout, Sahure's mortuary temple represented the "conceptual beginning" of all subsequent such temples of the Old Kingdom. It contained five basic elements, exemplified in the temple of Khafre: an entrance hall, an open courtyard, a five-niche statue chapel, an offering hall, and storerooms. The dominant building material used in its construction, here as elsewhere, was limestone, but substantial valuable materials such as red and black granite, alabaster and basalt were also incorporated.

Entrance hall 
The transition between causeway and temple was marked by a large granite gate leading into the mortuary temple's entrance hall. The hall has suffered considerably, rendering a precise reconstruction impracticable. It had a limestone floor, its walls had red granite dado above which was, probably, limestone decorated with painted bas-relief scenes, and it was covered by a stone barrel vault ceiling which had slits in its tympanum allowing the enclosure to be dimly lit. Contemporary sources identify this room as the pr-wrw meaning "House of the Great Ones", and it may be a replica of the hall of the royal palace, where nobles were received and certain rituals performed. At its end, a granite doorway led to a closed corridor surrounding an open courtyard.

Corridor and courtyard 

The corridor was paved with basalt, and its walls had a  granite dado, above which they were decorated with colourful relief. On its north wall, scenes depict the king fishing and hunting wildfowl, while on the south wall the king is depicted hunting – antelopes, gazelles, deer and other horned animals are shepherded into an enclosure for the king to shoot with his bow and arrow, after which hound dogs seize and kill the animals, elsewhere hyenas are observed poaching, and hedgehogs and jerboa scatter into their holes – whilst his courtiers observe. The sedate posture of the king's courtiers, representing order, is juxtaposed against the mass of wounded and frightened animals depicted in a variety of postures and facing various directions, representing chaos. The imposing figure that is Sahure is unrivalled in any other example, and the gruesome detail of the injured animals is unreplicated. The figure of a hyena, pawing at an arrow in its jaw, reappears frequently in the Middle and New Kingdom, an homage to the relief from Sahure's temple. Ptahhotep's tomb in Saqqara contains an abridged, and slightly less skilfully executed, copy of this hunting scene.

The Egyptologist Mark Lehner suggests that the corridor represented the untamed wilderness, surrounding a clearing – the open courtyard – of which the king was guarantor. From the reliefs depicting ships on the east-corridor west-wall and west-corridor (transverse corridor) east-wall, the Egyptologist Dorothea Arnold contends that the courtyard and corridor form an architectural unit analogous to the Egyptian benben myth. The other reliefs present symbolize the king's role as guarantor of order and prosperity on the sacred island. Among the reliefs of this room an important discovery was made. One of the individuals present has been modified to include a brief inscription identifying them as "Neferirkare King of Upper and Lower Egypt" (nsw-bỉt Nfr-ỉrỉ-kꜣ-rꜥ). From this detail, Kurt Sethe, who was responsible for compiling and preparing the scenes for publication, developed the hypothesis that Neferirkare Kakai and Sahure were brothers, and that Neferirkare had had the relief corrected after ascending to the throne.

The open courtyard was paved with polished basalt and lined with sixteen red granite columns, supporting the roof of an ambulatory. Aside from an alabaster altar in the north-west corner decorated with scenes of sacrifice, the open courtyard is bare, though it originally had statues of the pharaoh placed between the columns, and may once also have contained statues of kneeling captives. Eleven of the original sixteen granite columns were found in the temple. The Two Ladies appear on these columns as well: Nekhbet, the vulture goddess, in the south half representing Upper Egypt, and Wadjet, the cobra goddess, in the north half representing Lower Egypt. Above, a red granite architrave bore the royal titulary, and further supported the limestone ceiling. The ambulatory's blue painted ceiling was decorated with yellow stars, whilst its limestone walls were decorated with polychrome bas-reliefs, fragments of which have been preserved, depicting the king's victory over his enemies – on the north wall Near Eastern peoples, on the south Libyans – and the acquired spoils. In a particular scene, showing the capture of animals, supplementary inscriptions identify the quantities seized: "123,440 head of cattle, 223,400 asses, 232,413 deer, and 243,688 sheep". In another scene, the family of a Libyan chief beg for his life to be spared whilst the king prepares to execute him. Under the northern ambulatory, a relief of exemplary craftsmanship depicting precious oil vases and Syrian brown bears was found. The figures were given rounded edges so that they simultaneously blend in with the background and stand out clearly. Much of the paint used has been preserved: a dark red-brown colour was used for the vase and a yellow-brown for the bear's fur. Up to a further eleven scenes remain too fragmentary to be reconstructed.

Transverse corridor and storage galleries 
Beyond the courtyard is a transverse (north-south) corridor which separates the public outer from the private inner temple, which only priests were allowed to access. The corridor further served as an intersection connecting the outer and inner temples, the courtyard surrounding the pyramid, and the cult pyramid. At its northern end was a staircase up to the roof terrace. Its floor was paved with basalt, as the courtyard was, and its walls had a granite dado, above which was limestone decorated with bas-relief. On the north half of the corridor's east wall is a relief, considered by the Egyptologist Iorwerth Eiddon Stephen Edwards to be amongst the most interesting in the temple, that depicts the king and his court observing the departure of twelve sea-going vessels, probably on expedition to Syria or Palestine. In the south-half, a similar scene depicts the king and his court awaiting the arrival of ships laden with cargo and several Near Eastern peoples, who do not appear to be prisoners, indicating either a commercial or, perhaps, diplomatic mission. In the centre of the west wall of the corridor was an alabaster staircase that led into the five-niche statue chapel.

The columns supported an architrave, a fragment of which has been found in the oil press of St. Jeremiah monastery in Saqqara. The niche's walls were decorated with reliefs depicting processions of offering bearers, and they had recessed side doors leading to two-story storage galleries. The northern gallery consisted of ten rooms arranged in two rows, each outfitted with its own staircase – cut directly into the limestone walls – leading to the second story. These held cult objects used for the temple rituals. The southern gallery consisted of sixteen or seventeen rooms, also arranged in two rows and outfitted with staircases, that probably held sacrificial offerings. Reliefs in the corridors leading to the galleries even included ritual instructions, such as "presentation of gold" or "sealing a box containing incense" found in the north and south corridors respectively.

Statue chapel 
The transverse corridor staircase leads into the five-niche statue chapel, a room with considerable religious importance. Accessed through a double-door, it had a floor paved with white alabaster, red granite sheathing in the niches and dado, fine white limestone sheathed walls elsewhere which was lavishly decorated in relief, and a limestone ceiling decorated with stars evoking the night sky of the Duat. A small staircase stood before each niche, which was once occupied by a statue, none of which have been preserved. It was originally assumed that each statue represented one of the king's five names, but the Abusir Papyri, discovered in the nearby pyramid of Neferirkare, indicate otherwise. The papyri identify that the central statue represented the king as Osiris, while the two outermost ones represented him as the king of Upper Egypt, and the king of Lower Egypt. The remaining two are not identified. Exiting the chapel to the south is a path leading through two rooms – including a rectangular vestibule that appears to be a predecessor of the antichambre carrée, first found in Nyuserre's mortuary temple – passing around a great stone massif and into the westernmost room of the temple, the offering hall.

Offering hall and auxiliary rooms 
The offering hall of the temple held the most significance for the royal mortuary cult. It was entered through a black granite door that opened up to a white alabaster paved floor, and walls with dado of black granite above which was fine white limestone decorated with polychromatic bas-relief depicting divinities bringing offerings to the king, and covered along its length by a vaulted ceiling with painted stars. A low alabaster altar stood at the west wall, at the foot of a granite false door, possibly covered in copper or gold, through which the spirit of the king would enter the room to receive his meal, before returning to his tomb. Unusually, the false door has been crudely fashioned, and bears none of the names, titles, or sacrificial formulas that are expected to be found. This led Borchardt to speculate that the door may have originally been sheathed with metal that was eventually stolen by thieves. The room also originally contained a black granite statue and an offering basin, located in a recessed niche in its south-west corner, with an outflow of copper piping. In the north wall, a granite doorway gives access to five auxiliary rooms, which served the offering hall.

Drainage system 
Rainfall captured on the roof was funnelled out through stone lion-head spouts fit onto the tops of the outer walls. The choice of the lion-head may relate to the ancient Egyptian belief that Set and other inimical deities could manifest themselves in rain. The lion, a symbolic protector of sacred ground, consumed the harmful spirits and ejected harmless water. Where no roof existed, gaps around the base of the outer walls collected the water, conducting it out using channels cut into the paving. Water and other liquids used in rituals and ceremonies, which had become impure and thus dangerous to touch, were removed using the drainage system. Five stone and copper-plated basins, each with a lead plug to fit the vent, were placed around the inner temple. The first was found in the offering hall, two more were in the auxiliary rooms beyond it, a fourth in the corridor leading up to the offering hall, and the fifth in the northern magazine gallery. These were connected via an intricate network of copper pipes laid beneath the temple, which led down the length of the causeway before terminating at an outlet on its southern side.

Cult pyramid 
By the main pyramid's south-east corner, confined to a separate enclosure, lies a cult pyramid. The enclosure is accessed from either the southern end of the transverse corridor, or through a portico – the side entrance to Sahure's mortuary temple – flanked by two granite columns bearing Sahure's royal titulary. The portico floor was paved with basalt, as were the dado of its walls, above which the walls were built of limestone and decorated with polychromatic relief. The reliefs portrayed rows of deities, nome and estate personifications, and fertility figures – all clutching was-sceptres and ankh signs – marching into the temple. An accompanying inscription bears their message to the king: "We give you all life, stability, and dominion, all joy, all offerings, all perfect things that are in Upper Egypt, since you have appeared as king of Upper and Lower Egypt alive forever". Beyond the portico, a room with two exits gives access to the transverse corridor in the north or to an oblong room preceding the cult pyramid in the south.

The cult pyramid had a core ascending in two or three steps, composed primarily of limestone block debris framed by yellow limestone blocks, and then encased with white limestone blocks – the same method of construction as used in the main pyramid. From the north face, a bent corridor – initially descending, then switching to an ascent – leads into the miniature pyramid's sole chamber: an east–west oriented burial room slightly below ground level. The chamber was found void of any content, and its walls had been severely damaged by stone thieves.

The purpose of the cult pyramid remains unclear. Its burial chamber was not used for burials, but instead appears to have been a purely symbolic structure. It may have hosted the pharaoh's ka (spirit), or a miniature statue of the king. It may have been used for ritual performances centring on the burial and resurrection of the ka spirit during the Sed festival.

Necropolis 
There is a largely unexplored necropolis found through the side-entrance on the transverse corridor's southern end. It is thought to be the burial ground of Sahure's consort, Meretnebty, and son, Netjerirenre.

Later history

Funerary cult 
The funerary cults at Abusir remained active through the reign of Pepi II at the end of the Sixth Dynasty, but their continuation beyond this time is a matter of dispute. Daily services, including offerings made before the false door of the offering hall and at the statues of the chapel, were held in the mortuary temple. Reliefs on the temple's side entrance walls depict processions of individuals with offerings entering into the temple, accompanied by detailed instructions for the butchers and porters. Sahure's funerary domains were also depicted on the reliefs of the causeway. Portrayed are processions of offering bearers bringing foodstuffs and leading animals into the temple. More than 200 funerary domains of Lower Egypt are shown on these blocks accounting for the most extensive record of such funerary domains yet discovered.

Priests who served Sahure's funerary cult include Tepemankh II, who also served numerous other kings from Sneferu to Userkaf; Nikare, priest of the cult of Sahure and of the sun temple of Nyuserre; Senuankh and Nenkheftka, priests of the cults of Userkaf and Sahure; Kaemnefret, priest in Sahure's pyramid and in Neferirkare's pyramid and sun temple; Kuyemsnewy and Kamesenu, priests of the cults of Sahure, Neferirkare and Nyuserre.

Cult of Sekhmet 

From at least the reign of Thutmose III of the Eighteenth Dynasty, the south corridor of Sahure's mortuary temple became home to a cult of Sekhmet. The cult's early history is unknown. Borchardt suggested that it originated in the Middle Kingdom, but there is no evidence to support this conjecture. The earliest attested royal connection to the cult is Thutmose IV of the Eighteenth Dynasty. Further attestations include Ay and Horemheb, Amenhotep III through a faience object with his name, and Seti I and Ramesses II through restoration inscriptions bearing their names. The renewed attention had a negative consequence as it brought on the first wave of dismantlement of the Abusir monuments, particularly for the acquisition of valuable Tura limestone. Sahure's mortuary temple may have been spared at this time due to the presence of the cult. Its influence probably waned after the end of Ramesses II's reign, becoming a site of local worship only.

The Abusir necropolis and Sahure's cult garnered attention again in the Twenty-Fifth to Twenty–Sixth Dynasties. Taharqa had various reliefs replicated – such as images of the king in the form of a sphinx crushing his enemies – from the mortuary temples of Sahure, Nyuserre, and Pepi II for the restoration of the temple of Kawa in Nubia. The cult of Sekhmet is also mentioned in a graffito found in the temple from Ahmose II's reign. In the late Twenty-Sixth to the early Twenty-Seventh Dynasty, another period of dismantlement appears to have been visited on the monuments. Sahure's was again spared, protected by the cult into the Ptolemaic Kingdom, though it had very reduced influence at this time.

A third wave of dismantlement of the Abusir monuments is attested in the Roman period by the abundant remains of mill-stones, lime production facilities, and worker shelters. At the beginning of the Christian era, Copts founded a shrine in the temple, as shown by pottery and Coptic graffiti dating to between the 4th and 7th centuries AD. Periodic farming of the monuments for limestone continued at least until the end of the 19th century.

See also 
 List of Egyptian pyramids

Notes

References

Sources

Further reading 

 Zahi Hawass, Miroslav Verner: Newly Discovered Blocks from the Causeway of Sahure (Archaeological Report). In: Mitteilungen des Deutschen Archäologischen Instituts, Abteilung Kairo. (MDIAK) vol. 52, von Zabern, Wiesbaden 1996, pp. 177–186.
 Tarek el-Awady: King Sahure with the Precious Trees from Punt in a Unique Scene, in: Proceeding of “Art and Architecture of the Old Kingdom”, Prague 2007 pp. 37–44.
 Tarek el-Awady: The Royal Navigation Fleet of Sahure, in: Study in Honor of Tohfa Handousa, ASAE (2007).

Pyramids of the Fifth Dynasty of Egypt
Buildings and structures completed in the 25th century BC
3rd-millennium BC establishments in Egypt
19th-century archaeological discoveries
Limestone buildings
Abusir